Sir Curtis Alexander Price, KBE (born 1945, in Springfield, Missouri, USA) was the Warden of New College, Oxford, between October 2009 and September 2016. He was previously principal of the Royal Academy of Music from 1995 to 2008 and Professor of Music in the University of London. He retired as the warden of New College at the end of August 2016.

Price was raised in Charleston, Illinois, and received his undergraduate musical training at Southern Illinois University Carbondale.  He attained a Ph.D from Harvard University. He moved to the United Kingdom in 1981 to teach at King's College London, latterly as head of department. Price is a trustee of Musica Britannica, the Handel House Museum and the British Library Sound Archive, a governor of the Purcell School and a Patron of Bampton Classical Opera. During his tenure as principal of Royal Academy of Music, the academy became a full school of University of London, it developed collaborations with Juilliard School (New York) and other music schools abroad, it acquired important archives (including the Foyle Menuhin archive) and in 2005 it acquired the "Viotti ex-Bruce" Stradivari violin.

In 2005, Price was appointed honorary Knight Commander of the Order of the British Empire (KBE) for services to music. The knighthood was made substantive in the New Year Honours List 2006.

He is married to Professor Rhian Samuel, a composer.

Notes

References
The Royal Academy of Music
Interview with Curtis Price

American emigrants to England
British musicologists
British music educators
American musicologists
American music educators
Harvard University alumni
Principals of the Royal Academy of Music
Academics of King's College London
Fellows of King's College London
Wardens of New College, Oxford
Living people
1945 births
Honorary Members of the Royal Academy of Music
Southern Illinois University Carbondale alumni
People from Charleston, Illinois
Naturalised citizens of the United Kingdom